Malachy Gerard McCourt (born 20 September 1931) is an Irish-American actor, writer, one-time pub owner, and politician. He was the 2006 Green Party of New York candidate for governor in New York State, losing to the Democratic candidate Eliot Spitzer. He is the younger brother of author Frank McCourt.

Personal life
McCourt was born in New York City, the son of Irish parents Angela (née Sheehan) and Malachy McCourt. He is the last survivor of their seven offspring, following the death of his younger brother Alphonsus in 2016. McCourt was raised in Limerick, Ireland, and returned to the United States in 1952. He has four children: Siobhán, Malachy III, Conor, and Cormac, the latter two by his second wife, Diana. He also has a stepdaughter, Nina. He was portrayed by Peter Halpin in the film version of his brother's memoir Angela's Ashes. He is also one of the four founding members of the Manhattan Rugby Football Club in 1960. Malachy appears in Frank McCourt's memoirs.

Film, stage, television, radio and music career
He has acted on stage, on television and in several movies, including The Molly Maguires (1970), The Brink's Job (1978), Q (1982), Brewster's Millions (1985), Tales from the Darkside as Dr Stillman in the "Ursu Minor" episode (2/10 - 1985), The January Man (1989), Beyond the Pale (2000), and Ash Wednesday (2002). He had appeared on three New York City-based soap operas: Ryan's Hope, Search for Tomorrow, and One Life to Live. He is also known for his annual Christmas-time appearances on All My Children as Father Clarence, a priest who shows up to give inspirational advice to Pine Valley citizens.

In the 1970s he hosted a talk show on WMCA.

In 1970, McCourt released an album, And the Children Toll the Passing of the Day.

In recent years he has occasionally appeared on various programs on New York City's political radio station, WBAI. Among the shows on which he has appeared has been Radio Free Éireann. He is also a regular guest artist at the Scranton Public Theatre in Pennsylvania, having performed in Inherit the Wind, Love Letters and A Couple of Blaguards which he co-wrote with brother Frank McCourt. Currently, Malachy has been hosting a call-in radio forum on WBAI, airing on Sunday mornings at 11 am. He also had a short-lived role as a Catholic priest on the HBO prison drama Oz. He was the owner of Malachy's, a bar on Third Avenue in New York. One of his frequent patrons was actor, and friend, Richard Harris, who although famous worked for a short time behind the bar for McCourt. McCourt played Francis Preston Blair in Gods and Generals (2003).

Writing

McCourt has written two memoirs titled, respectively, A Monk Swimming and Singing My Him Song, detailing his life in Ireland and his later return to the United States. He has also authored a book on the history of the ballad Danny Boy, and put together a collection of Irish writings, called Voices of Ireland.

Politics
On Tuesday, 18 April 2006, McCourt announced that he would seek to become governor of New York in the November 2006 election as a Green Party candidate.  Running under the slogan "Don't waste your vote, give it to me", McCourt promised to recall the New York National Guard from Iraq, to make public education free through college, and to institute a statewide comprehensive "sickness care" system. McCourt polled at 5% in a 10 October Zogby poll, versus 25% for Republican John Faso and 63% for Democrat Eliot Spitzer. McCourt was endorsed by Cindy Sheehan, mother of a fallen soldier in the Iraq War. The League of Women Voters excluded him from the gubernatorial debate. He came in a distant third in the general election, received 40,729 votes (or just under 1%), 9,271 votes short of what was required to gain automatic access in the 2010 election.

Bibliography 

  "I Am Not Myself At All"  essay in The Face in the Mirror: Writers Reflect on Their Dreams of Youth and the Reality of Age (2009) Victoria Zackheim, editor  Prometheus Books ;
 Bush Lies in State (2004) Sensei Publications ;
 Harold Be Thy Name: Lighthearted Daily Reflections for People in Recovery (2004) Carhil Ventures ; 
 History of Ireland (2004) Running Press ;
 The Claddagh Ring: Ireland's Cherished Symbol Of Friendship, Loyalty And Love (2003) Running Press ;
 Danny Boy: The Legend of the Beloved Irish Ballad (2003) New American Library ;
 Voices of Ireland: Classic Writings of a Rich and Rare Land (2002) Running Press ;
 Singing My Him Song (2000) HarperCollins ;
 A Monk Swimming: A Memoir (1998) Hyperion ;
 Through Irish Eyes: A Visual Companion to Angela McCourt's Ireland (1998) Smithmark Publishing .

A Monk Swimming

A Monk Swimming (1998) is a memoir by Malachy McCourt of his life in Limerick, Ireland, and of his experiences when he came to America. The book recounts the journey and the many obstacles that McCourt had to overcome. After first working as a longshoreman, he was able to open a successful Manhattan tavern frequented by entertainment celebrities, and appeared on television talk shows, although neglecting his wife and child.

This memoir picks up roughly where Frank McCourt, the author's older brother, left off at the end of his Pulitzer Prize–winning Angela's Ashes.  This book was written and published before the elder McCourt published his own sequels, 'Tis and Teacher Man.

Malachy McCourt's account of his early years in New York City and its surrounding areas lends a different, if not altogether more brusque, account of Frank and Malachy McCourt's respective returns to their native United States, and the migration of Michael and Alphie McCourt, from their native Limerick.

Some notable sections include:

 A chance meeting with Elizabeth II and her husband Prince Philip, Duke of Edinburgh at a football club reception for the couple.
 A "summer of content" spent living, drinking, and carrying on with married women in Ocean Bay Park, Fire Island at night while by days selling The Bible door-to-door across the Great South Bay in Bay Shore, Long Island.
 The description of the Ancient Order of Hibernians as "Ireland's most mediocre sons" (paraphrase).  This seems to be tied to their banning of homosexual groups from marching in the New York City St. Patrick's Day Parade.

The title is a mondegreen of "amongst women", a phrase from the Catholic rosary prayer, Hail Mary.

The book is dedicated to New York City politician, humanitarian, and fellow Irishman Paul O'Dwyer, who at the time of first publication had recently died.  McCourt and O'Dwyer had been close friends and politically like-minded.

References

External links

 Malachy's Personal Website
 
 
 A Couple of Blaguards, the stageplay Malachy performs with his brother, Frank
  A song about McCourt's bar on Third Avenue. By Maggie and Terre Roch

1931 births
Living people
People from New York City
Male actors from Limerick (city)
American actors
American memoirists
American people of Irish descent
Green Party of the United States politicians